Tous les matins du monde (All the mornings of the world) is a 1991 French film based on the book of the same name by Pascal Quignard. Set during the reign of Louis XIV, the film shows the musician, Marin Marais, looking back on his young life when he was briefly a pupil of Monsieur de Sainte-Colombe, and features much music of the period, especially that for the viola da gamba. The title of the film is explained towards the end of the film; « Tous les matins du monde sont sans retour » ("all the mornings of the world never return") spoken by Marais in chapter XXVI of Quignard's novel when he learns of the death of Madeleine.

Background

In the same year as the book's release, author Quignard, together with director Alain Corneau, adapted the novel for the film that starred Jean-Pierre Marielle, Gérard Depardieu, Anne Brochet and Guillaume Depardieu.

The film revolves around the late-17th/early-18th-century composer Marin Marais's life as a musician, his mentor Monsieur de Sainte-Colombe and Sainte-Colombe's daughters. The ageing Marais, played by Gérard Depardieu, narrates the story, while Depardieu's son Guillaume Depardieu plays the young Marais. The haunting sound of his instrument, the viol (viola da gamba), here played by Jordi Savall, is heard throughout the film and plays a major role in setting the mood. Though fictional, the story is based on historical characters, and what little is known about their lives is generally accurately portrayed.

The film credits the scenes set in the salon of Louis XV as having been filmed in the Golden Gallery (Galerie dorée) of the Banque de France.

Described as a "crossover movie" with the music integrated into the story-line, Derek Malcolm saw Marielle's performance as "matching the music note for note".

Synopsis
Aging court composer Marin Marais (Gérard Depardieu) recalls his former master and unequalled viol player, the Jansenist, Monsieur de Sainte-Colombe. After the death of his wife, Sainte-Colombe buries himself in his music, bringing up his two daughters on his own, teaching them to be musicians, and playing in a consort with them for local noble audiences. His reputation reaches the court of Louis XIV and the king sends an envoy, Caignet, to request him to play at court. Sainte-Colombe curtly dismisses the envoy, as well as the Abbé Mathieu. Offended, the King ensures that very few attend concerts by Sainte-Colombe and his daughters. Sainte-Colombe shuts himself away in a cabin in his garden in order to perfect the art of viol playing, and to indulge in visions of his dead wife.

Some years later, 17-year-old Marin Marais visits Sainte-Colombe, seeking to learn from the master. After a short time,  Sainte-Colombe sees no musical merit in the young man and sends him away, refusing to teach him. Madeleine, the elder daughter, is saddened as she has fallen in love with Marais. She teaches him what her father has taught her and allows him to listen in secret to her father playing. During this time, Marais is hired to be a court musician.

Marais and Madeleine begin a relationship. Marais leaves Madeleine; she is pregnant and gives birth to a still-born child. Marais marries another woman, Madeleine's younger sister marries and has five children, life goes on. Later, Madeleine falls gravely ill. Sainte-Colombe calls Marais to his house where the dying Madeleine asks to hear her former lover play a piece he wrote for her: La rêveuse or The Dreaming Girl. After Marais leaves, Madeleine hangs herself with the ribbons of a pair of shoes, a rejected gift Marais had given her.

Years later, the aged Marais returns to learn from his master; Sainte-Colombe recognises finally Marais's musicianship.

Cast
 Gérard Depardieu as Marin Marais
 Jean-Pierre Marielle as Monsieur de Sainte-Colombe
 Anne Brochet as Madeleine
 Guillaume Depardieu as Young Marin Marais
 Carole Richert as Toinette
 Michel Bouquet as Baugin
 Jean-Claude Dreyfus as Abbe Mathieu
 Yves Gasc as Caignet
 Yves Lambrecht as Charbonnières
 Jean-Marie Poirier as Monsieur de Bures
 Myriam Boyer as Guignotte
 Caroline Silhol as (the ghost of) Madame de Sainte-Colombe

Music
As listed in the film's credits, the music heard includes the following:
Sainte Colombe: Les pleurs; Gavotte du tendre; Le retour
Marin Marais: Improvisation sur les Folies d'Espagne; L'arabesque; Le Badinage; La rêveuse
Jean-Baptiste Lully: Marche pour la cérémonie des Turcs
François Couperin: Troisième leçon de Ténèbres
Savall: Prélude pour Monsieur Vauquelin; Une jeune fillette, d’après une mélodie populaire; Fantaisie en mi mineur, d’après un anonyme du XVIIème

Apart from Savall, the musicians are Monserrat Figueras and Mari-Cristina Kiehr (sopranos), Christophe Coin and Jérôme Hantaï (viola da gamba), Rolf Lislevand (theorbo) and Pierre Hantaï (harpsichord and organ).

Reception
The film grossed $3,089,497 in the United States and Canada. In the United Kingdom it grossed £793,748 ($1.2 million).

Awards and nominations
César Awards (France)
Won: Best Actress – Supporting Role (Anne Brochet) 
Won: Best Cinematography (Yves Angelo)
Won: Best Costume Design (Corinne Jorry)
Won: Best Director (Alain Corneau) 
Won: Best Film
Won: Best Music (Jordi Savall)
Won: Best Sound (Anne Le Campion, Pierre Gamet, Gérard Lamps and Pierre Verany)
Nominated: Best Actor – Leading Role (Jean-Pierre Marielle)
Nominated: Best Editing (Marie-Josèphe Yoyotte) 
Nominated: Best Writing (Alain Corneau and Pascal Quignard)
Nominated: Most Promising Actor (Guillaume Depardieu)
42nd Berlin International Film Festival (Germany)
Official selection: Golden Bear (Alain Corneau)
Golden Globe Awards (USA)
Nominated: 1993 Best Foreign Language Film
Louis Delluc Prize (France)
Won: Best Film

References

External links

 http://www.medieval.org/emfaq/misc/tlmdm.htm For more details of the film's background

French musical drama films
French romantic musical films
1990s romantic musical films
1991 romantic drama films
1991 films
Films directed by Alain Corneau
Films about classical music and musicians
Films about composers
Films set in the 1670s
Films set in the 1700s
Films set in France
Films based on French novels
Films based on historical novels
Louis Delluc Prize winners
Best Film César Award winners
Films whose director won the Best Director César Award
1990s French-language films
1990s French films